A Beautiful Place to Drown is the tenth
 studio album by Canadian post-hardcore band Silverstein, released on March 6, 2020 through UNFD worldwide.

Release 
Silverstein released "Burn It Down" on June 27, 2019. With a vocal feature from Caleb Shomo of Beartooth, the song was the band's first new material since 2017's Dead Reflection. Vocalist Shane Told said that "Burn It Down" "picks up right where Dead Reflection left off". On January 8, 2020, they released the next single, "Infinite", with guest vocals from Aaron Gillespie of Underoath. That same day, they announced the details of their new album, including the title, release date, album art, and track list, as well as plans for an extensive tour with support from Hawthorne Heights, Four Year Strong, and I the Mighty. The third single, "Bad Habits", came out on February 5 and included a guitar feature from Aaron Mashall from Intervals. The last single to debut in advance of the album's release was Princess Nokia collaboration "Madness", released on March 2.

Track listing

Charts

See also
List of 2020 albums

References 

2020 albums
UNFD albums
Silverstein (band) albums